Constituent Assembly elections were held in Austria on 16 February 1919.

The Social Democratic Workers' Party emerged as the largest party, winning 72 of the 170 seats. The party was largely supported by the working class, whilst farmers and the middle class voted mainly for the anti-Anschluss Christian Social Party. Voter turnout was 84.4%. As Czechoslovakia prevented their eligible population from participating in the election, and Italy and Yugoslavia had gained control of South Tyrol (as a result of the 1915 Treaty of London) and Lower Styria (following border conflicts), respectively, voting only was held in small parts of those eligible territories, and representatives were instead appointed in proportion to parties' total overall vote share.

The first meeting of the assembly was on 4 March 1919. The Sudeten German Social Democrats organised a series of demonstrations in support of their right of self-determination. Across seven cities 54 persons were killed and another 84 wounded by the Czech military and police.

Electoral system 
The members of the Constituent National Assembly were elected in multi-member constituencies having between four and nine seats each by proportional representation. The smallest constituency was originally set to elect three seats, but did not do so due to Yugoslavia having gained control of most of Lower Styria.

This election was the first election in which all women were allowed to vote. German citizens living in Austria, Lower Styria, and South Tyrol and Sudeten Germans living in the newly-formed Czechoslovakia were also allowed to vote in the elections, despite Czechoslovak objections. Austrian citizens living in Germany were also allowed to vote in the elections for the Weimar National Assembly in the same year.

Results
The two main parties, the SDAPÖ and the CS, formed a coalition government after the elections. Although it had broken up by mid-1920, it was followed for a short time by a transitional coalition of SDAPÖ, CS, and the Greater German People's Party, a successor of the German People's Party following a merger with the Greater German Union. Ultimately, a new constitution was agreed on 1 October 1920. Fresh elections were held on 17 October.

References

Austria
Constituent
Elections in Austria
Austria